Chhar is a village of Abbottabad District in Khyber-Pakhtunkhwa province of Pakistan. It is located at 34°7'0N 73°9'0E with an altitude of 1437 metres (4717 feet). Neighbouring settlements include Sohlan, Batangi and Kandar.

References

Populated places in Abbottabad District